The Fall Guy is a 1921 American silent comedy film featuring Larry Semon and Oliver Hardy.

Plot
From a November 1921 newspaper ad for the film: "A funny film of life as it might be. A fantasy of cowboys who saddle automobiles and bad men who get wild on ice cream cones. This is the first [Larry] Semon comedy we have been able to get for over two months and can't get another for a long time, so don't miss The Fall Guy. Said to be his best."

Cast
 Larry Semon as Larry, the Fall Guy
 Norma Nichols as Prima Donna
 Oliver Hardy as Gentleman Joe, alias Black Bart (as Babe Hardy)
 Frank Alexander as Sheriff
 William Hauber
 Al Thompson

See also
 List of American films of 1921
 Oliver Hardy filmography

References

External links

1921 films
American silent short films
American black-and-white films
1921 comedy films
1921 short films
Films directed by Larry Semon
Silent American comedy films
American comedy short films
1920s American films